Oncideres captiosa is a species of beetle in the family Cerambycidae. It was described by Martins in 1981. It is known from Paraguay and Brazil.

References

captiosa
Beetles described in 1981